This is a list of episodes of the South Korean variety-music show King of Mask Singer in 2023. The show airs on MBC as part of their Sunday Night lineup. The names listed below are in performance order.

 – Contestant is instantly eliminated by the live audience and judging panel
 – After being eliminated, contestant performs a prepared song for the next round and takes off their mask during the instrumental break
 – After being eliminated and revealing their identity, contestant has another special performance.
 – Contestant advances to the next round.
 – Contestant becomes the challenger.
 – Mask King.

Episodes

191st Generation Mask King

Episode 386
Episode 386 was broadcast on January 8, 2023, skipping a week.

Episode 387

Episode 387 was broadcast on January 15, 2023.

192nd Generation Mask King
Contestants: Soyeon of (Laboum), Poongja, Kim Sang-su, Woody, 

Episode 388
Episode 388 was broadcast on January 22, 2023.

Episode 389

Episode 389 was broadcast on January 29, 2023.

193rd Generation Mask King

Episode 390
Episode 390 was broadcast on February 5, 2023.

Episode 391

Episode 391 was broadcast on February 12, 2023.

194th Generation Mask King
Contestants: Kim Jae-seok of (Wanted), Kevin of (The Boyz), TBA

Episode 392
Episode 392 was broadcast on February 19, 2023.

Episode 393

Episode 393 was broadcast on February 26, 2023.

195th Generation Mask King
Contestants: Choi Yu-ree, Cho Yi-hyun, Leedo of (Oneus), Lee Se-young, Zizo

Episode 394
Episode 394 was broadcast on March 5, 2023.

Episode 395

Episode 395 was broadcast on March 12, 2023.

196th Generation Mask King
Contestants: TBA, Yeo Hyun-soo, TBA, TBA, Yang Joon-hyuk, Zelo of (B.A.P), TBA

Episode 396
Episode 396 was broadcast on March 19, 2023.

Episode 397

Episode 397 will be broadcast on March 26, 2023.

References

Lists of King of Mask Singer episodes
Lists of variety television series episodes
Lists of South Korean television series episodes
2023 in South Korean television